(September 18, 1851 – August 10, 1887) was a Japanese daimyō of the late Edo period. He was first the lord of the Ojima Domain (in Suruga Province); however, with Tokugawa Iesato's move into Suruga, Nobutoshi's holdings were moved to the Sakurai Domain, which comprised the territory of the former Jōzai Domain. He ruled Sakurai for three years until it was disestablished in 1871.

|-

Daimyo
Tokugawa clan
People of the Boshin War
1851 births
1887 deaths